Huffman Bros. Motor Co. was a small car manufacturing firm based in the town of Elkhart, Indiana, United States.  It entered business in 1918 and produced cars from 1920 to 1925.

It produced multiple models of cars and trucks, including the Huffman Six car, and the Huffman Truck.

References

Motor vehicle manufacturers based in Indiana
Defunct motor vehicle manufacturers of the United States
Cars introduced in 1919
Companies based in Elkhart County, Indiana
Vehicle manufacturing companies established in 1919
Vehicle manufacturing companies disestablished in 1925
1919 establishments in Indiana
1925 disestablishments in Indiana
Defunct manufacturing companies based in Indiana